Phyllobacterium loti is a bacterium from the genus of Phyllobacterium which was isolated from nodules from the plants Lotus corniculatus in Uruguay.

References

Phyllobacteriaceae
Bacteria described in 2014